Golebiewski or Gołębiewski (feminine: Gołębiewska; plural: Gołębiewscy) is a Polish surname. It is sometimes spelled Golembiewski or Gołembiewski (feminine: Gołembiewska).

People
 Daniel Gołębiewski (born 1987), Polish footballer
 Henryk Gołębiewski (born 1942), Polish politician
 Henryk Gołębiewski (born 1956), Polish actor
 Marek Gołębiewski (born 1980), Polish football manager
 Marian Gołębiewski (1911–1996), Polish soldier and resistance fighter
 Marian Gołębiewski (born 1937), Polish archbishop

See also
 
 Golebiowski, a related surname

Polish-language surnames